Saint Gerebern (or Gerebernus, Genebern, Genebrard, Gereborn, Gerebran, Gerebrand, Herbern; died 7th century)  was an Irish priest who baptized Saint Dymphna when she was a child.
He was her companion when she fled to Belgium, where he was murdered beside her. His relics were taken to Sonsbeck in Germany, where they were an object of pilgrimage until they were destroyed during World War II.
His feast day is 15 May.

Life

According to the biography Vitae Dymphnae et S. Gereberni presbiteri (English: Life Dymphna and St. Gerebern priest), which Peter of Cambrai, a canon of the Abbey of St-Géry-et-Aubert in Cambrai, recorded in the 13th century, Gerebernus was an Irish priest who lived in the 6th or 7th centuries. 
He was the tutor of Dymphna, the daughter of an Irish tribal king. 
After her mother's death, the king wanted Dymphna to marry.
She then fled with Gerebern to Geel in what is now Belgium, where they were discovered and beheaded by the king.

According to legend, both Dymphnas and Gerebernus' bones were stolen from Geel in their coffins by "robbers from Xanten". 
According to popular belief, the stealing of the bones of saints was not considered theft, as they could only be stolen if the saint agreed. 
However, Dymphna's bones could no longer be moved on the way to Xanten, and some citizens of Geel are said to have pursued the "robbers", so that they took some of Gerebernus' bones from the coffin and fled.
Only a few kilometers before Xanten, in the area of today's Sonsbeck, Gerebernus' bones could no longer be moved, so they were buried there and a chapel was built for him.

Legacy

Reports about miracles that happened at the grave of St. Gerebernus triggered pilgrimages there.
The pilgrimage to St. Gerebern continued in the 18th century.
The pilgrimage ended with the destruction of Sonsbeck by bombing in 1945 during World War II.

Gerebernus is usually depicted as a bearded priest.
His iconographic saints' attributes are palm and lance.
St. Gerebernus is considered the patron saint against chiragra (gout-related pain in the wrist), paralysis and epilepsy.
His Catholic feast day is May 15.
Sometimes July 13 is also mentioned as a day of remembrance.

Monks of Ramsgate account

The monks of St Augustine's Abbey, Ramsgate wrote in their Book of Saints (1921),

Butler's account

The hagiographer Alban Butler (1710–1773) wrote in his Lives of the Fathers, Martyrs, and Other Principal Saints under May 15,

Baring-Gould's account

Sabine Baring-Gould (1834–1924) in his Lives Of The Saints wrote under April 11,

Baring-Gould writes under May 15 of St. Gerebern, or Genebrand, Priest, Martyr and Patron of Sonsbeck after an extensive account of Saint Dympna for the same day.
He notes that most of the information is given in sources that described Dympna. He goes on,

Notes

Sources

 
 
 

 

 

Medieval Irish saints on the Continent
7th-century deaths